Scouleriales is an order of haplolepideous mosses in the subclass Dicranidae.

References

Moss orders
Bryopsida